Givira gnoma is a moth in the family Cossidae. It is found in Brazil (Santa Catarina).

The wingspan is about 34 mm. The basal half of the inner margin on the forewings is dark chocolate brown, its outer edge oblique edged with white. The space above it and beyond it is roseate grey. The hindwings are pale grey with some darker striae, and a dark shade medially 
below the costa.

References

Natural History Museum Lepidoptera generic names catalog

Givira
Moths described in 1921